Crossings is a 1986 American TV miniseries based on the bonkbuster novel by Danielle Steel.

Cast
Cheryl Ladd as Liane Devilliers
Lee Horsley as Nick Burnham
Christopher Plummer as Armand Devilliers
Jane Seymour as Hillary Burnham
Garrick Dowhen as Philip Markham
Stewart Granger as George Hackett
Joan Fontaine as Alexandra Markham
Joanna Pacuła as Marissa Freilich
Horst Buchholz as Martin Goertz
Zach Galligan as Robert Devilliers
Jan Rubes as Isaac Zimmerman
Carl Steven as Johnny Burn

References

External links

Review at ''New York Times'

1986 television films
1986 films
Films based on works by Danielle Steel
Films directed by Karen Arthur